The Haig Open Invitational was a golf tournament on the PGA Tour that was held in 1968 at the Mesa Verde Country Club in Costa Mesa, California. Bob Dickson, a 24-year-old Oklahoman, won the event by two strokes over Chi-Chi Rodríguez.

Winner

References

Former PGA Tour events
Golf in California